6 Below: Miracle on the Mountain is a 2017 American survival drama film directed by Scott Waugh and written by Madison Turner, based on the non-fiction book Crystal Clear by Eric LeMarque and Davin Seay. It stars Josh Hartnett, Mira Sorvino, Sarah Dumont and Jason Cottle, and tells the true story of former professional hockey player Eric LeMarque, who finds himself stranded in the High Sierra during a fierce snowstorm and must use his wit and willpower to survive. The film was released in the United States on October 13, 2017.

Premise
In February 2004, when a snowstorm strands former professional hockey player Eric LeMarque atop the Sierra Nevada Mountains, he is forced to rediscover the power of faith within him in order to survive.

Cast
 Josh Hartnett as Eric LeMarque

Production
In February 2016, it was announced the first film former Relativity Studios president Tucker Tooley would finance 6 Below, based on the memoir by Eric LeMarque. Filming began in Utah in March 2016.

Release
In February 2017, Momentum Pictures acquired the distribution rights to the film, later setting it for an October 13, 2017 release.

Critical response
On review aggregator Rotten Tomatoes the film holds an approval rating of 22% based on 18 reviews, with an average rating of 4.37/10. On Metacritic, the film has a weighted average score of 40 out of 100, based on 5 critics, indicating "mixed or average reviews".

References

External links
 

2017 biographical drama films
2017 independent films
American biographical drama films
American independent films
American survival films
Drama films based on actual events
American ice hockey films
2017 drama films
Films based on non-fiction books
Films directed by Scott Waugh
2010s English-language films
2010s American films